Parliamentary elections were held in the Kingdom of Croatia-Slavonia on 16 and 17 December 1913. There were 209,618 eligible male voters. According to the census of December 31, 1910, the Kingdom of Croatia-Slavonia had a population of 2,621,954.

The Croatian parliament had been dissolved by ban Slavko Cuvaj on 27 January 1912. On April 4 Cuvaj suspended the constitution and the following day was proclaimed commissioner of the Kingdom. Over the course of the following year two assassination attempts were made on Cuvaj, leading to his withdrawal as commissioner. Ivan Skerlecz was proclaimed ban on November 27, 1913 and called elections for 16 and 17 December.

Results

Elected representatives

Sources
 Branko Dubravica: Parlamentarni izbori u Hrvatskoj i Velikoj Gorici (1848.-1938.); Albatros, Velika Gorica 2004, pp. 189–190, 

Elections in Croatia
Croatia
1913 in Croatia
Elections in Austria-Hungary
December 1913 events
Kingdom of Croatia-Slavonia
Election and referendum articles with incomplete results